Vi Kaley, (19 November 1878, Lambeth - 1967, Marylebone), was a British actress. She was married to Alfred Artois.

Partial filmography
 Lloyd of the C.I.D. (1932)
 A Royal Demand (1933)
 Gay Old Dog (1935)
 The Man Without a Face (1935)
 I Live Again (1936)
 Men of Yesterday (1936)
 The Song of the Road (1937)
 Auld Lang Syne (1937)
 On Velvet (1938)
 The Second Mr. Bush (1940)
 Love on the Dole (1941)
 Front Line Kids (1942)
 Gert and Daisy's Weekend (1942)
 Variety Jubilee (1943)
 Fanny by Gaslight (1944)
 I'll Turn to You (1946)
 The Trojan Brothers (1946)
 Code of Scotland Yard (1947)
 The Fool and the Princess (1948)
 Woman Hater (1948)
 My Brother Jonathan (1948)
 The Mudlark (1950)
 Something in the City (1950)
  Scrooge (1951)
 My Wife's Lodger (1952)
 Cosh Boy (1952)
 Behind the Headlines'' (1953)

References

External links
 

Year of birth unknown
Year of death unknown
British film actresses